Blue Bird is a 2011 Belgian drama film directed by Gust Van Den Berghe, based on the 1908 play by Maurice Maeterlinck. The film was shot in Togo and won a Special Mention at the 2011 Flanders International Film Festival Ghent. The film was also screened in the Directors' Fortnight section at the 2011 Cannes Film Festival.

Plot summary

Cast
 Bafiokadie Potey as Bafiokadie
 Tene Potey as Tene

References

External links
 
 

2011 films
2011 drama films
Belgian drama films
Belgian films based on plays
2010s French-language films
Films based on works by Maurice Maeterlinck
Films shot in Togo
Works based on The Blue Bird (play)